Kato Acharnes railway station is a station on the Piraeus–Platy railway line in Agioi Anargyroi, West Athens. This station opened on 27 February 2014. It owes its name to the area of Kato Acharnes, and is located next to Merimna Square.

History
The station opened on 27 February 2014. In 2017 OSE's passenger transport sector was privatised as TrainOSE, currently, a wholly-owned subsidiary of Ferrovie dello Stato Italiane rail infrastructure, remained under the control of OSE while station infrastructure under Gaiose.

Facilities
The station building is above the platforms, with access to the platform level via stairs or lift. Access to the station is via steps or ramp. The station buildings are also equipped with toilets and a staffed ticket office. At platform level, there are sheltered seating and Dot-matrix display departure and arrival screens or timetable poster boards on both platforms on both platforms. Currently, there is no local bus stop connecting the station with the center of Aigio. There is No car park at the station.

Services 

Since 15 May 2022, the following weekday services call at this station:

Northbound trains diverge from here, with Line 1 trains heading eastbound along the Attiki odos, and Line 2 trains heading westbound. Line 3 trains do not call at this station.

Station layout

See also
Hellenic Railways Organization
Hellenic Train
Proastiakos
P.A.Th.E./P.

References

Fyli
West Athens (regional unit)
Attica
Railway
Railway stations in Attica
Buildings and structures in West Attica
Transport in Athens
Transport in Attica
Transport in West Attica
Railway stations opened in 2014